Devotion is the second album by the English jazz fusion guitarist John McLaughlin, released in 1970. It was recorded while McLaughlin was a member of Tony Williams Lifetime (prior to forming Mahavishnu Orchestra). McLaughlin was joined by his Lifetime bandmate, organist Larry Young, bass guitarist Billy Rich and former Electric Flag and Jimi Hendrix drummer Buddy Miles. McLaughlin was unhappy with the finished album. On his website, he wrote, “In 1969, I signed a contract in America for two records. First is 'Devotion' that is destroyed by producer Alan Douglas who mixes the recording in my absence.”

Critical reception 

In a contemporary review, Rolling Stone magazine called the album "very fine" and said that McLaughlin "has managed to make an album as Heavy as the most fanatical Led Zeppelin devotee could wish, while maintaining a high musical level". AllMusic awarded the album four and a half stars, and Sean Westergaard concluded, "Devotion is a complete anomaly in his catalog, as well as one of his finest achievements."

Track listing
All songs written by John McLaughlin.
Side one
 "Devotion" – 11:25
 "Dragon Song" – 4:13

Side two
 "Marbles" – 4:05
 "Siren" – 5:55
 "Don't Let the Dragon Eat Your Mother" – 5:18
 "Purpose of When" – 4:45

Personnel
John McLaughlin – electric guitar
Larry Young – organ, electric piano
Billy Rich – bass guitar
Buddy Miles – drums, percussion

References

External links 
 

1970 albums
John McLaughlin (musician) albums
Psychedelic rock albums by English artists
Jazz fusion albums by English artists
Albums produced by Alan Douglas (record producer)